The Scent of Joseph's Shirt is a 1995 war and drama film written and directed by Ebrahim Hatamikia, Iranian director, who is described as "of the most outstanding directors of war genre." The film is on the Iran–Iraq War prisoners of war. In an interview, Hatamikia said that the film portrays his perception of the concept of the reappearance of Muhammad al-Mahdi.

Plot
Daei Ghafoor is a taxi driver whose son is said to have been killed during the Iran–Iraq War, but he does not believe it. Despite all the evidence pointing to the death of his son, Yousef, he still is waiting for his return. One day, Daei Ghafoor meets a woman, Shirin, in the airport. Shirin has returned to Iran from Europe to find her brother, Khosrow, a missing soldier in the war. Both begin looking for their loved ones.

Cast

The following actors played role in the film:
 Ali Nasirian
 Hasan Pourshirazi
 
 Niki Karimi
 Shirin Bina

Reception
In an interview, Ebrahim Hatamikia said he was asked why he would not make a film on Imam Mahdi, a question to which he replied: "I have created that; The Scent of Joseph's Shirt! ...it was the movie portraying my perception of the awaiting concept." According to Shahram Jafarinejad, a film critic, The Scent of Joseph's Shirt deals with awaiting and awaiters. Mohammad Ghouchani, Iranian journalist, said: "...no movie had been able to portray the concept of awaiting as much as The Scent of Joseph's Shirt did... ."

The Scent of Joseph's Shirt is the first "female-centric movie" by Hatamikia and features a "strong female central character".

Music
The film score is produced by Majid Entezami, Iranian composer, and musician.

References

External links
 

1995 films
Iranian war drama films
Prisoners of war in popular culture
Films about families